The Houston Apollos were a minor professional ice hockey team based in Houston, Texas. They played in the Central Hockey League from 1965 to 1969, and then from 1979 to 1981.

From 1965 to 1969, they were a farm team of the NHL's Montreal Canadiens. The Canadiens pulled the team out and moved it to Montreal, where they became the Montreal Voyageurs of the American Hockey League. Aside from cutting back on travel costs, the Canadiens cited problems in Houston of low attendance, poor choice of dates in the local arena, and lack of practice time.

The team was revived in 1979, after the Houston Aeros of the World Hockey Association folded. The team only lasted one and a half seasons before folding on January 8, 1981.

The team played in the Sam Houston Coliseum. Unbeknownst to many, before his Hall of Fame NHL career began with the Edmonton Oilers, Mark Messier  played 4 games with the Apollos in 1979 before going to Edmonton.

Season-by-season records

Central Hockey League

References

Central Professional Hockey League teams
Defunct ice hockey teams in Texas
Edmonton Oilers minor league affiliates
Ice hockey teams in Houston
Montreal Canadiens minor league affiliates